Dinamo Stadium is a multi-use stadium in Samarkand, Uzbekistan. It is currently used mostly for football matches and is the home stadium of Dynamo Samarkand.

History
The stadium was built in 1963. The original capacity was 13,820 people. After reconstruction works in 2011 the stadium capacity expanded to 16,000. The stadium became all-seater stadium.

References

Football venues in Uzbekistan
Buildings and structures in Samarkand
Sport in Samarkand
Sports venues built in the Soviet Union